Sundoreonectes is a genus consisting of two species of stone loaches from the southeast Asian island of Borneo.

Species
There are currently two recognized species in this genus, but the single Speonectes species was formerly included in Sundoreonectes.

 Sundoreonectes obesus (Vaillant, 1902)
 Sundoreonectes sabanus (P. K. Chin, 1990)

References

 
Taxonomy articles created by Polbot